Ordinsky District is an administrative district (raion) of Perm Krai, Russia; one of the thirty-three in the krai. Municipally, it is incorporated as Ordinsky Municipal District. It is located in the southeast of the krai, mostly in the valley of the Iren River. Its administrative center is the rural locality (a selo) of Orda. As of the 2010 Census, the total population of the district was 15,605, with the population of Orda accounting for 34.4% of that number.

History
The district was established on February 26, 1924 and became a part of Perm Oblast in October 1938. It was abolished on February 1, 1963 and restored on January 12, 1965.

Demographics
Ethnic composition:
Russians: 80.5%
Tatars: 16.9%

Economy
The economy of the district is based on agriculture and petroleum industry.

Landmarks
The Orda Cave, one of the longest underwater caves and the largest underwater gypsum cave in the world, is located in Ordinsky District.

References

Notes

Sources

Districts of Perm Krai
States and territories established in 1924
States and territories disestablished in 1963
States and territories established in 1965
1924 establishments in Russia
1965 establishments in Russia